The Okeechobee Plain is a major geologic feature of Florida formed during the Pliocene and Pleistocene epochs and named for Okeechobee County, Florida, United States.

Description
The Okeechobee Plain is a dry prairie or grassland
 located directly north of Lake Okeechobee and is present in the counties of Highlands (eastern), Glades (northeastern), Indian River (western) and Okeechobee where it is present along the western bank of the Kissimmee River.

The Okeechobee Plain is within the Kissimmee/Okeechobee Lowland established by the Florida Department of Environmental Protection's Lake Bioassessment/Regionalization Initiative.

Origin
The Okeechobee Plain was created during the Pliocene and Pleistocene's wild climatic times through continuous depositing of sediments from rivers as the peninsula grew southward. During the Piacenzian (3.6—2.5 Ma) stage of the Pliocene the plain, was, for the most part, submerged and is referred to as part of the Kissimmee Embayment.

Bounding geographic features
The two major geographic features bounding the Okeechobee Plain are the Osceola Plain to the north and Caloosahatchee Incline to the southwest.(Florida EPA Basin Status)

See also
DeSoto Plain

References

Geology of Florida